Barent Momma (15 February 1897 – 31 January 1936) was a Dutch modern pentathlete. He competed at the 1924 Summer Olympics.

References

External links
 

1897 births
1936 deaths
Dutch male modern pentathletes
Olympic modern pentathletes of the Netherlands
Modern pentathletes at the 1924 Summer Olympics
Sportspeople from Bergen op Zoom